Jesse "Babyface" Thomas (February 3, 1911 – August 13, 1995) was an American Texas blues guitarist and singer. Known at different times as "Baby Face" or "Mule", and occasionally billed as "The Blues Troubadour", his career performing blues music extended eight decades.

Career
Born in Logansport, Louisiana, United States, Thomas is best known for the song "Blue Goose Blues", which he recorded for Victor in 1929. He recorded and performed throughout the 1940s and 1950s, based in the Los Angeles area. He recorded for Specialty Records in 1953.

His career spanned over 60 years – in 1994 he appeared at the Long Beach Blues Festival. The Texas bluesman, Ramblin' Thomas, was his brother, and fellow Louisiana blues guitar player, Lafayette Thomas, was his nephew.

A longtime resident of the Lakeside neighborhood of Shreveport, Louisiana, Thomas died there on August 15, 1995 at the age of 84.

Discography
1996 Lookin' for That Woman (Black Top – BT 1128)
2001 Blues Is A Feeling (Delmark)

References

External links
 [ Biography on Allmusic]

1911 births
1995 deaths
African-American guitarists
American blues guitarists
American male guitarists
American blues singers
Singers from Louisiana
Modern Records artists
Ace Records (United States) artists
Black Top Records artists
Specialty Records artists
Delmark Records artists
People from Logansport, Louisiana
Texas blues musicians
20th-century African-American male singers
20th-century American guitarists
Guitarists from Louisiana
Guitarists from Texas
20th-century American male musicians